Baron Feversham is a title that has been created twice, once in the Peerage of Great Britain and once in the Peerage of the United Kingdom. The first creation, in the Peerage of Great Britain, came in 1747 when Anthony Duncombe, who had earlier represented Salisbury and Downton in the House of Commons, was made Lord Feversham, Baron of Downton, in the County of Wilts. He had previously inherited half of the enormous fortune of his uncle Sir Charles Duncombe. However, Lord Feversham had no sons and the barony became extinct on his death in 1763. The peerage was revived in the Peerage of the United Kingdom in 1826 in favour of his kinsman Charles Duncombe, who was created Baron Feversham, of Duncombe Park in the County of York. He was a former Member of Parliament for Shaftesbury, Aldborough, Heytesbury and Newport. Duncombe was the grandson of Thomas Duncombe, son of John Brown (who assumed the surname Duncombe) by his wife Ursula Duncombe, aunt of the first Baron of the 1747 creation. Ursula had inherited the other half of her brother Sir Charles Duncombe's fortune. Lord Feversham son, the second Baron, sat as a Conservative Member of Parliament for Yorkshire and the North Riding of Yorkshire.

He was succeeded by his son, the third Baron. He represented East Retford and the North Riding of Yorkshire in the House of Commons as a Conservative. On 25 July 1868 he was created Viscount Helmsley, of Helmsley in the North Riding of the County of York, and Earl of Feversham, of Ryedale in the North Riding of the County of York. He was succeeded by his grandson, the second Earl, who sat in Parliament as a Conservative representative for Thirsk and Malton. He was killed in the First World War, when the titles were inherited by his son, the third Earl. He notably served as a Lord-in-waiting (government whip in the House of Lords) from 1934 to 1936 in the National Government. On his death in 1963 the viscountcy and earldom became extinct. However, he was succeeded in the barony of Feversham by his distant relative (his fourth cousin), the sixth Baron. He was the great-great-grandson of Admiral the Honourable Arthur Duncombe, fourth son of the first Baron.  the title is held by his eldest son, the seventh Baron, who succeeded in 2009.

Several other members of the Duncombe family have also gained distinction. Anthony Duncombe, father of the first Baron of the 1747 creation, was Member of Parliament for Hedon. The aforementioned Sir Charles Duncombe, uncle of the first Baron of the 1747 creation, was a wealthy banker. Thomas Slingsby Duncombe, nephew of the first Baron of the 1826 creation, was a Radical politician. The aforementioned Admiral Arthur Duncombe, fourth son of the first Baron, was an Admiral in the Royal Navy and Member of Parliament. He was the father of 1) Arthur Duncombe, a Conservative Member of Parliament, and 2) George Augustus Duncombe, who was created a baronet in 1919 (see Duncombe baronets). The Very Reverend Augustus Duncombe (1814–1880), younger son of the first Baron, was Dean of York. The Honourable Octavius Duncombe, younger son of the first Baron, represented the North Riding of Yorkshire in Parliament.

The ancestral seat of the Duncombe family is Duncombe Park near Helmsley, Yorkshire.

Barons Feversham, first creation (1747)
Anthony Duncombe, 1st Baron Feversham (1695–1763)

Barons Feversham, second creation (1826)
Charles Duncombe, 1st Baron Feversham (1764–1841)
Charles Duncombe (c. 1795 – 1819)
William Duncombe, 2nd Baron Feversham (1798–1867)
Hon. Albert Duncombe (1826–1846)
William Ernest Duncombe, 3rd Baron Feversham (1829–1915) (created Earl of Feversham in 1868)

Earls of Feversham (1868)
William Ernest Duncombe, 1st Earl of Feversham (1829–1915)
William Reginald Duncombe, Viscount Helmsley (1852–1881)
Charles William Reginald Duncombe, 2nd Earl of Feversham (1879–1916)
Charles William Slingsby Duncombe, 3rd Earl of Feversham (1906–1963)

Barons Feversham, second creation (1826; reverted)
(Charles Anthony) Peter Duncombe, 6th Baron Feversham (1945–2009)
Jasper Orlando Slingsby Duncombe, 7th Baron Feversham (born 1968)

The heir apparent is the present holder's son, the Hon. Orlando Balthazar Duncombe (born 2009).

Male-line family tree

See also
Earl of Feversham
Duncombe baronets

References

External links

Baronies in the Peerage of Great Britain
Extinct baronies in the Peerage of Great Britain
Baronies in the Peerage of the United Kingdom
Duncombe family
Noble titles created in 1747
Noble titles created in 1826
Noble titles created for UK MPs